The gymnastics competition in the 1993 Summer Universiade were held in Buffalo, New York, United States.

Artistic gymnastics

Men's events

Women's events

External sources
 Gymnastics results of the 1993 Summer Universiade

Summer Universiade
1993 Summer Universiade
1993